CITYFLO 650 signalling is a CBTC system designed by Bombardier Transportation. It makes use of bi-directional radio communication between trains and wayside equipment, as well as true moving block technology, to control train operation. Trains report their position via radio, and a wayside signalling system provides movement authorities to the trains via a radio link.

Transit lines using the system 
Transit lines using the Cityflo 650 system as of February 26, 2014 include the following:

In revenue service 
 Seattle Tacoma Int'l Airport, SeaTac, USA
 Sacramento Int'l Airport, Sacramento, USA
 San Francisco Int'l Airport, San Francisco, USA
 McCarran Int'l Airport, Las Vegas, NV, USA
 Phoenix Int'l Airport, Phoenix, USA
 Dallas/Fort Worth Int'l Airport, Dallas, USA
 SEPTA Subway-Surface Trolley Lines, USA
 Heathrow Int'l Airport, UK
 Gatwick Int'l Airport, UK
 Line 1 and Line 6, Madrid Metro, Spain
 Yong-In ART, South Korea
 Wenhu Line, Taipei, Taiwan
 Line 3, Shenzhen Metro, China
 APM Line, Guangzhou Metro, China
 Line 2 and Line 3, Tianjin Metro, China
 Purple Line, Thailand
 Line 9, MRT Kajang Line, Malaysia
 Line 12, MRT Putrajaya Line, Malaysia 
  Line 15, São Paulo Metro, Brazil 
 M5 and M7, Istanbul Metro, Turkey
 Bangkok Gold Line feeder system, Thailand

Under construction
 BTS Yellow Line Monorail (EBM), Thailand
 BTS Pink Line Monorail (NBM), Thailand
 Dubai Int'l Airport, United Arab Emirates
 King Abdulaziz Int'l Airport, Jeddah, Saudi Arabia
 King Abdullah Financial District Monorail, Riyadh, Saudi Arabia
 Metro Tunnel (Sunbury Dandenong Line) - Melbourne, Australia
 MRTA Pink Line and Yellow Line, Thailand
 Line 7, Delhi Metro, India
 Line 5 Eglinton, Toronto, Canada
 Bukit Panjang LRT, Singapore

Test tracks
These dedicated lines are used to test compatible rolling stock:

 Pittsburgh Test Track, USA
 Kingston Test Track, Canada

References 

Train protection systems
Vehicle telematics